The Kokura Nisai Stakes (Japanese 小倉2歳ステークス) is a Grade 3 horse race for two-year-old Thoroughbreds run in September over a distance of 1200 metres at Kokura Racecourse.

The race was first run in 1961 and was promoted to Grade 3 status in 1984.

Winners since 2000

Earlier winners

 1984 - Dyna Super
 1985 - Kyowa Shinzan
 1986 - Sankin Hayate
 1987 - Pot Naopoleon
 1988 - Dandy Apollo
 1989 - Hagino High Touch
 1990 - T M Lisme
 1991 - Zinc Tamon O
 1992 - Maruka Iris
 1993 - Nagara Flash
 1994 - Eishin Sansan
 1995 - Eishin Itto O
 1996 - Godspeed
 1997 - Takeichi Kento
 1998 - Koei Roman
 1999 - Alluring Act

See also
 Horse racing in Japan
 List of Japanese flat horse races

References

Turf races in Japan